Gerwin Pardoel (born 12 May 1981), better known by his stage name Gers Pardoel or mononymously as Gers, is a Dutch rapper. He rose to fame in 2009, due to his successful collaboration with The Opposites on the single "Broodje Bakpao". Pardoel's debut studio album Deze wereld is van jou was released in November 2011 and was certified Platinum by the NVPI. The Nederhop artist is best known for his number-one single "Ik neem je mee", which became the most successful Dutch-language and Dutch-artist hit in the Dutch Top 40 ever.

Biography

1981–2002: Early life
Gerwin Pardoel was born on 12 May 1981 in Nijmegen, thirty-five minutes before his younger twin brother Robbie. When Pardoel was young, his father was purchaser at a nursing home. Later, his father worked for the theme park De Efteling in Kaatsheuvel. His mother was a housewife and took care of the children.

When Pardoel was 17 years old, his life changed when his mother died from cancer. His life was turned upside down and the relation with his father deteriorated enormously. To escape from his difficult home situation, Pardoel looked for refuge in roller skating. He was a very fanatical roller skater and wanted to reach the Dutch roller skating top. Together with Steffen Haars and Huub Smit (nowadays known as the characters of New Kids), he practiced almost every day in an inline skate hall in 's-Hertogenbosch. The hall became a "new home" for Pardoel. He reached the ninth position in a national roller skating competition.

2002–2010: Career beginnings
Pardoel became interested in hip hop. In Rotterdam, he met rapper Postman (Remon Stotijn). Postman and his then-wife Anouk helped him to discover the world of hip hop. They made up Pardoel's stage name Gers. Despite the fact that the name Gers is very similar to his own name Gerwin, "gers" also means "cool" or something like that in Rotterdam dialect. Postman highly influenced Pardoel's performing stile.

Pardoel improved his rapping skills and began developing himself as a producer. He started working on songs for a future album. At some point, Pardoel showed his old friend Steffen Haars (who had become director of New Kids in the meantime) some of his raps. Haars was impressed and put him in touch with rappers Sef and Big2. That resulted in the recording of the song "Broodje Bakpao". The hit single, which was included in the soundtrack of the movie New Kids Turbo and reached the first position in the Mega Single Top 100, resulted in an enormous rise of fame for Pardoel. Due to this success, Pardoel received a recording contract at Dutch label TopNotch. The next success for Pardoel was the single "Ik ga hard". This song, by The Partysquad featuring Gers Pardoel, Adje, Jayh and Reverse, became a popular song among teenagers.

2011–present: Deze wereld is van jou and De toekomst is van ons
On 14 October 2011, Pardoel released his debut studio album Deze wereld is van jou. After a lot of work (the recordings of the album started already in 2009), the release was finally there. The second single of the album, "Ik neem je mee", became a great success and reached the number-one position in both the Dutch Top 40 and the Mega Single Top 100. The album was certified Platinum by the NVPI. The album also included the single "Bagagedrager" among others. Three years later, another studio album was released, called De toekomst is van ons. It didn't match the success of its predecessor, but includes the Platinum-certified single "Louise".

Due to his musical success in the Flemish part of Belgium, Pardoel became a coach in the Flemish version of The Voice Kids in the shows 4th and 5th seasons. In the summer of 2021, the Belgian popular newspaper Het Laatste Nieuws published stories in which Sélina van Gool (Pardoel's former partner, mother of his children, and also his former manager) accused him of domestic abuse, both physical and psychological in nature.  Van Gool also posted on Instagram on the topic, screenshots of her private profile are visible in the newspaper articles. The newspaper added specifically that they were able to check police reports supplied by van Gool which confirmed her allegations. Subsequently Pardoel did not return in the 2022 season of The Voice Kids. It is noteworthy that both VTM which airs The Voice Kids and Het Laatste Nieuws are brands of Mediahuis. However, also in 2022, Pardoel was welcomed as the presenter of the Flemish version of Come Dance With Me on Play4, a channel of SBS Belgium.

Discography

Studio albums

Singles

As lead artist

Featured singles

Other appearances

Awards and nominations

Gers Pardoel has been nominated for several Dutch awards since 2010.

3FM Awards
The 3FM Awards is an annual awards ceremony by the Dutch radio station 3FM. Pardoel has been nominated for five awards in 2012 and won two awards of them.

|-
| align="center" rowspan="5"| 2012
| "Ik neem je mee"                                           
| Best Single
| 
|-
| Deze wereld is van jou                                           
| Best Album
| 
|-
| rowspan="3"| Gers Pardoel                                         
| Best Hiphop Artist
| 
|-                                        
| Best New Artist
| 
|-                                        
| 3FM Serious Talent Award
| 
|-

3VOOR12 Awards
Every year, the Dutch multimedia platform 3VOOR12 composes a top 100-list of the best songs of the year. Pardoel's song "Ik neem je mee" ended at the 20th position in the list of 2011, while Gotye's song "Somebody That I Used to Know" ended at the first position and became Song of the Year 2011.

|-
| align="center" rowspan="1"| 2011
| "Ik neem je mee"                                           
| Song of the Year
| 
|-

Edison Music Awards
The Edison Music Awards is an annual Dutch music awards ceremony. The awards are for outstanding achievements in the music industry. It is one of the oldest music awards ceremonies in the world, having been presented since 1960. Pardoel has been nominated once for an Edison Music Award.

|-
| align="center" rowspan="1"| 2010
| "Broodje Bakpao" (with The Opposites and Sef)
| Best Single
| 
|-

Mega Awards
The Mega Award is awarded every year to the best Dutch artist of the year. It is initiated by 3FM, TROS and GfK Dutch Charts. Pardoel received the Mega Award in 2011.

|-
| align="center" rowspan="1"| 2011
| Gers Pardoel
| Mega Award 2011
| 
|-

Nickelodeon Kids' Choice Awards
The Nickelodeon Kids' Choice Awards is an annual awards show that airs on Nickelodeon that honors the year's biggest television, movie and music acts, as voted by Nickelodeon viewers. Pardoel has been nominated for one of the Netherlands Kids Choice Awards 2012. In 2013 he was nominated as well and won the award.

|-
| align="center "rowspan="1"| 2012
| Gers Pardoel
| Favourite star: Netherlands/Belgium
| 
|-

State Awards
The State Awards are awards for Dutch hip hop and urban artists. The ceremony is held every year since 2008. Pardoel has been nominated four times in 2010 and 2011.

|-
| align="center" rowspan="2"| 2010
| "Broodje Bakpao" (with The Opposites and Sef)
| Best Single
| 
|-
| Gers Pardoel
| Rookie of the Year
| 
|-
| align="center" rowspan="2"| 2011
| "Morgen ben ik rijk"
| Best Single
| 
|-
| Gers Pardoel
| Best Artist
| 
|-

TMF Awards
The TMF Awards are presented annually by Dutch music channel The Music Factory. Pardoel received two awards.

|-
| align="center" rowspan="2"| 2010
| rowspan="2"| "Broodje Bakpao" (with The Opposites and Sef)
| Best Video 
| 
|-
| Super Chart Award
| 
|-

Notes

References

External links
 

1981 births
Living people
Dutch rappers
Dutch twins
People from Nijmegen